Li Lei or Lei Li may refer to:

Lei Li (softball) (雷雳, born 1968), Chinese softball player and Olympic medallist
Li Lei (javelin thrower) (李蕾, born 1974), Chinese javelin thrower
Lei Li (weightlifter) (born 1975), Chinese weightlifter
Li Lei (baseball) (李磊, born 1984), Chinese baseball player
Li Lei (race walker) (born 1987), Chinese race walker
Li Lei (skier) (李雷, born 1987), Chinese alpine skier
Li Lei (sitting volleyball) (born 1991), Chinese beach volleyball player
Li Lei (footballer, born 1992) (李磊), Chinese football player
Li Lei (footballer, born 1995) (李雷), Chinese football player
Li Lei (beach volleyball), Chinese beach volleyball player